Eldeyjarboði is a blind skerry located about 57 km southwest of Reykjanes, Iceland. It is part of the Mid-Atlantic Ridge.

A submarine eruption occurred in 1830.  

In January 2020 the Icelandic Met Office stated that two earthquakes occurred 26 km southwest and 32 km south-southwest of Eldeyjarboði.

See also
 Nýey, a nearby eruptive island that appeared and disappeared in 1783/4. 
 List of volcanic eruptions in Iceland
 Volcanism of Iceland
 Geology of Iceland
 List of volcanoes in Iceland
 Geological deformation of Iceland

Sources
 Vísindavefurinn: "How common are new islands in eruptions?“ by Professor Sigurður Steinþórsson, 9 June 2005.]

References

Islands of Iceland
Former islands
Uninhabited islands of Iceland
Southwest Iceland
Mid-Atlantic Ridge
Skerries